The January Tree is the third full-length studio album by the progressive metal band Deadsoul Tribe, released on 30 August 2004 by InsideOut Music.

Track listing 
 "Spiders and Flies" − 6:05
 "Sirens" − 4:27
 "The Love of Hate" − 3:42
 "Why?" − 6:32
 "The Coldest Days of Winter" − 3:32
 "Wings of Faith" − 4:37
 "Toy Rockets" − 5:31
 "Waiting for the Answer" − 5:43
 "Just Like a Timepiece" − 7:20
 "Lady of Rain" − 3:31

Credits 
 Devon Graves − lead vocals, guitar, flute
 Roland Ivenz − bass
 Adel Moustafa − drums
 Roland Kerschbaumer − rhythm guitar
 Volker Wilschko − guitar

References

Deadsoul Tribe albums
2004 albums
Inside Out Music albums